The Roman theatre of Dougga is an ancient theatre located in Teboursouk in the north-west of Tunisia.

History 
Like all the other Roman cities of North Africa from the reign of Augustus, Dougga had its own theatre.  According to historians, the monument was built between 168 and 169. It is located in the eastern part of the archeological site Dougga, and can host over 3500 spectators.

The theatre got classified as a monument on 8 June 1891. It is considered as one of the best preserved examples of theatres in Roman Africa

Nowadays, it hosts every year the activities of the Dougga's international festival.

Architecture 
A dedication engraved into the pediment of the stage and on the portico the dominates the city, recalls the building's commissioner, P. Marcius Quadratus, who "built [it] for his homeland with his own denarii"; the dedication was celebrated with "scenic representations, distributions of life, a festival and athletic games".

Gallery

References 

 

Roman theatres
Roman sites in Tunisia
Dougga
Article from DouggaPedia project